"Way Outward Bound" (also known as "Outward Bounds" and "Baby Army") is an episode of the British comedy television series The Goodies. Written by The Goodies, with songs and music by Bill Oddie.

Plot
A 'circular' arrives at the Goodies' office from the Loch Jaw school, advertising for school children to take part in a "Way Outward Bound" adventure course.  The Goodies are interested — especially in the bounty fees being offered for any children who are brought to the school — but the Goodies are unable to get any children to go with them.

The Goodies decide to go themselves, so that they can still receive the bounty money.  They dress as children — with Graeme dressed as a schoolgirl (complete with twin plaits), Bill dressed in shorts and cap as a small schoolboy, and Tim dressed the same in black and white uniform, complete with a teddy bear.  The Goodies are accepted as children and admitted to the school by the school's Matron and an Army Sergeant Major.  Bill proves to be a precocious 'small child' by flirting with the Matron.

The Goodies later discover the true reason why the children are wanted by the school — the Matron wants to take over the world and has been conditioning several babies to obey orders (for a baby army) so conquer the world.  The Sergeant Major is unaware of the true reason why the Matron wants the children and babies to be trained for warfare — he just wants to train them.

When the Goodies escape from the clutches of the Matron, they take the babies with them — and find that they have their work cut out with feeding the babies and washing nappies etc. — they discondition the babies and turn them back into normal babies, with the aid of milk, and Tim discovers that he has the knack of being able to get the babies to burp on demand and starts contemplating taking over the world.  Bill and Graeme try to stop Tim from getting worse than the Matron.

Notes
 Joan Sims also appeared in an earlier Goodies episode, "Come Dancing". In her autobiography, High Spirits, she remembers having trouble reciting the long speeches the team wrote for her.

References

 "The Complete Goodies" — Robert Ross, B T Batsford, London, 2000
 "The Goodies Rule OK" — Robert Ross, Carlton Books Ltd, Sydney, 2006
 "From Fringe to Flying Circus — 'Celebrating a Unique Generation of Comedy 1960-1980'" — Roger Wilmut, Eyre Methuen Ltd, 1980
 "The Goodies Episode Summaries" — Brett Allender
 "The Goodies — Fact File" — Matthew K. Sharp

External links
 

The Goodies (series 3) episodes
1973 British television episodes